Graben (German for ditch) may refer to:
Graben, a kind of geological depression.

Places
Graben, Bavaria, a municipality in the district of Augsburg
Graben, Switzerland, a municipality in the canton of Bern
Graben, Ribnica, a village in the Municipality of Ribnica, southern Slovenia
Graben, a locality of the Graben-Neudorf municipality in Baden-Württemberg
Graben, Vienna, a famous street in Vienna
former name of Spodnje Stranice, a village in the municipality of Zreče, northeastern Slovenia

People
House of Graben von Stein, Austrian noble family
Andreas von Graben (d. 1463), Carinthian knight and burgrave in the County of Ortenburg
Friedrich II von Graben (d. before 1463), Austrian noble, Imperial councillor and burgrave
Rosina von Graben von Rain (d. 1534 (?)), Austrian noble woman
Ulrich II von Graben (d. about 1361), Austrian noble and burgrave
Ulrich III von Graben (d. 1486), Austrian noble, burgrave and Landeshauptmann of Styria
Virgil von Graben (d. 1507), son of Andreas, Austrian noble and official in the County of Görz
Wolfgang von Graben (d. 1521), son of Ulrich III, Austrian official.

See also
Grabner